Goffredo 'Freddie' Zehender (Reggio Calabria, Italy, 27 February 1901 - 7 January 1958) was an Italian racing driver.
He started his driving career with Chrysler, then Bugatti and most of his career with Alfa Romeo as works or private driver. He won the 1932
Grand Prix du Comminges with private Alfa Romeo 8C 2300 'Monza'.
From 1934 he raced also for Maserati.

Racing record

Complete 24 Hours of Le Mans results

Complete European Championship results
(key) (Races in bold indicate pole position) (Races in italics indicate fastest lap)

Notes
 – Zehender was co-driver with Minoia at the French GP and with Campari at the Belgian GP, therefore rules excluded him from the championship.

References

1901 births
1958 deaths
Sportspeople from Reggio Calabria
Italian racing drivers
Grand Prix drivers
24 Hours of Le Mans drivers
24 Hours of Spa drivers
European Championship drivers